Fort Raymond or alternatively Manuel's Fort or Fort Manuel, was an outpost established by fur trader Manuel Lisa and was named after his son. The post was located at the confluence of the Bighorn and the Yellowstone Rivers. Upon its foundation it was the first trading post maintained by European descendants in the modern state of Montana. It would be the first of several posts by Lisa over his time in the developing regional fur trade. Among those hired by Lisa for the expedition were several members of the Corps of Discovery at Fort Raymond, notably George Drouillard, John Colter and Peter M. Weiser, who were stationed at Fort Raymond.

Work began on the station in November 1807 with the initial buildings being "temporary shelters and a trading house with two rooms and a loft". Lisa oversaw daily operations for nine months after opening the post. During the winter, Colter was sent with trade goods to the Niitsitapi homelands to establish commercial relations. Colter met a group of indigenous men and agreed to travel with them. These men were from two nations that were traditional enemies of the Niitsitapi, the Salish and Apsáalooke. An armed group of Niitsitapiksi was encountered and a battle ensued, Colter joining his traveling party against the Nittsitapi. Colter's presence on the battlefield noted by Niitsitapiksi warriors, having a ruinous effect on future relations between Manuel Lisa's commercial efforts. 

Lisa returned to St. Louis in 1808, leaving a complement of fur trappers at Fort Raymond. Upon arriving at St. Louis Lisa joined William Clark in forming a jointly owned effort to exploit fur bearing populations, the Missouri Fur Company (MFC). After returning to the station in the spring of 1809, Lisa formally added Fort Raymond as MFC property. The station was abandoned after the opening of Fort Lisa in 1810.

References

Fur trade
Missouri River
History of United States expansionism
1807 establishments in the United States
Raymond